are the rapid reaction forces of Japanese prefectural police. These units are not only riot police, but a type of emergency service unit to maintain public order against large civil disorder, disaster response, or other emergency situations as the key units of Japanese law enforcement for crisis management. They are operated by prefectural police headquarters (PPH) under the supervision of the Security Bureau of the National Police Agency.

Background 
At the same time, it was decided to set up similar units in other prefectures with major cities. However, in 1946, the Security Units were disbanded as part of police reforms enacted by the Supreme Commander for the Allied Powers under the occupation.

In addition, similar but smaller-scale riot squads were created in several other prefectures to deal with post-war turmoil. In 1957, the TMPD Reserve Units were renamed the Riot Police Unit. By 1962, all PPHs had the same kind of units.

Organization 

Most PPHs have only one unit, but some urban PPHs have multiple units. For example, there are ten units (nine ordinary units and one Special Vehicle Unit) in the TMPD.

Each unit consists of a headquarters and some companies. The public relations divisions, known as "DJ cops", are placed in each unit headquarters. They rely on eloquent and humorous speaking to prevent crowd disasters.

Specialist squads 
The equipment of the anti-riot officers is largely the same as that of regular police officers. However, equipment used in riot control operations, such as protective gear, may differ. And within the Riot Police Units, there are certain squads with specific equipment and training.

Counterterrorism 

At this time, these squads were part-time sniper teams called only when needed. Then, in 1996, they were reorganized as local full-time counterterrorism squads cooperating with the national-level Special Assault Teams. Also since 2002 Heckler & Koch MP5 submachine guns have been deployed, the equipment has also been strengthened.
Its current strength is about 1,900 officers. They are mainly mandated for gun violence, and also serve as first responders for emergency situations at nuclear power plants. Certain units with enhanced capabilities are established in urban prefectures, such as the Emergency Response Team (ERT) of the TMPD, the Armed Response Team (ART) of the Osaka PPH, and the Riot And Tactics Squad (RATS) of the Saitama PPH.

Chemical, biological and nuclear defense squads. In some PPHs, they had been enhanced as an independent unit. They work in coordination with the AFS and the SAT.

Bomb disposal squad

Search and rescue 

Technical rescue squads equipped with Heavy rescue vehicles. Ordinary rescue squads are part-time units, but in the Security Bureau of the TMPD (outside of its Riot Police Units), there is also , the only full-time rescue team in Japanese police.

In 1969, the TMPD established a Ranger squad in its 7th Riot Police Unit under the support of the Japan Ground Self-Defense Force. Its primary mission was mountain rescue, but with its superior mountaineering skills, this squad was used to deal with hostage rescue missions such as the Asama-Sansō incident.

Public safety diving and rescue swimmers squads.

Also, as non-permanent units prepared for large scale disasters, the  have been established based on the lesson of the Great Hanshin earthquake. Members of these units work mainly in Riot Police Units or Regional Riot Police Units during peacetime, but they regularly gather and train in preparation for disasters.

Reserves 
Full-time riot police units can also be augmented by auxiliary riot police units with regular police officers trained in riot duties. There are two types of auxiliary riot police units: 

 These units operate as a reserve duty forces under control of each PPH, temporary formation units being organized by gathering police officers who usually work at police stations.

These units are under control of Regional Police Bureaus of the NPA for regional operations as reinforcements to the other prefectures. In many prefectures, they are part-time units organized by members selected from the front-line units of each PPHs, such as inter-regional patrol units or mobile investigation units; but in some prefectures, they are full-time units and usually deployed in the same way as regular Riot police units under the command of each PPHs. Even though they are reserves, they are well equipped and trained not much different from regular units according to the national standards of the NPA.

Operational history 
Riot Police Units have been widely deployed in dealing with large civil disorder, disaster response, counter-terrorism operations, and so on as below:
  (1952)
 Some of the International Workers' Day protesters were incited by Zengakuren and League of Koreans, causing riots. As a result, some of the TMPD Reserve Units members were forced to use pistols because of the frequent occurrence of violent acts, such as burning foreigners' cars and throwing policemen into the moat.
 Many Riot Police Units were dispatched from other police headquarters because of the large-scale flood damage. In particular, the Second Riot Police Unit of the TMPD were highly appreciated, and became known as "Kappa".
  (1969)
 At the University of Tokyo, the student movement had been intensifying since 1968, triggered by a demand for improvement in the treatment of internships at the Faculty of Medicine. Then, with the left-wing rebel groups joined this movement to find allies for the Anpo protests, they stood up in the school buildings and brought in weapons such as Molotov cocktails. With university officials unable to deescalate the incident, TMPD Riot Police Units were deployed to retake the occupied school buildings.
 Asama-Sansō incident (1972)
 The United Red Army had been trained in the mountains, but was discovered by the Riot Police Unit of the Nagano PPH, turned into a gunfight and held hostage. After a 10-day siege, Nagano PPH, with the support of TMPD, Kanagawa and Yamanashi PPH, carried out a rescue operation. The criminals fired guns, threw bombs and violently resisted, while one Superintendent and one Chief inspector of the TMPD Riot Police Unit were killed and many police officers were injured, but all five criminals were arrested and the hostage was also rescued safely.
 Activities against Aum Shinrikyo (1995)
 In response to the Tokyo subway sarin attack, the TMPD Riot Police Units worked with the Tokyo Fire Department to rescue the victims. They also assisted the detectives raiding into the facilities at Yamanashi Prefecture. For this task, they borrowed personal protective equipments from the SDF.
 Humanitarian response to the 2011 Tōhoku earthquake and tsunami
 In response to the massive damage caused by the tsunami, the Police mobilized Riot Police Units, Regional Riot Police Units and Interprefectural emergency rescue units in an effort to rescue them. And as the reaction to Fukushima Daiichi nuclear disaster, Riot Police Units conducted evacuation guidance for the elderly and patients, and also carried out water discharge to the reactor building and measured the air radiation dose.

References

Bibliography

External links 
 

Special forces of Japan
Non-military counterterrorist organizations
Police units of Japan